Local elections in Botswana were held on 16 October 2009 for the district councils of the Districts of Botswana.

Overall Results

Results By District

Central District

Francistown City

Gaborone City

Ghanzi District

Jwaneng

Kgalagadi District

Kgatleng District

There was a tie in one constituency and a by-election was on 5 December 2009. The Botswana Democratic Party (BDP) candidate won, increasing their total seats from 7 to 8.

Kweneng District

Lobatse

North-East District

North-West District

Selibe Phikwe

South-East District

Southern District

Local elections
Botswana
Local elections in Botswana
Botswana local elections